"Runaway Love" is a 1978 disco single written and produced by Gil Askey, and performed by Linda Clifford.

Background and chart performance
The single was from Clifford's album, If My Friends Could See Me Now, and along with the tracks "If My Friends Could See Me Now" and "Gypsy Lady" reached number one on the US dance chart for five weeks. The single also peaked at No. 76 on the Billboard Hot 100 and No. 3 on the R&B chart.

See also
List of number-one dance singles of 1978 (U.S.)

References

1978 singles
1978 songs
Linda Clifford songs